Cerocida is a spider genus known only from tropical South America.

Both sexes of C. strigosa have a cephalothorax with posterior stalk and raised reticulate pattern, and long legs. The female has a body length of 1.5mm, while males are even 1.7mm; normally spider males are at least slightly smaller than females. Specimens were collecting by sifting litter. The species is probably an ant mimic.

References
  (1963): The Spider Genera Cerocida, Hetschkia, Wirada and Craspedisia (Araneae: Theridiidae). Psyche 70: 170-179. PDF
  (2007): The world spider catalog, version 8.0. American Museum of Natural History.

Spiders of South America
Theridiidae
Araneomorphae genera